Saint-Maurice-Étusson is a commune in the Deux-Sèvres department of western France. The municipality was established on 1 January 2016 and consists of the former communes of Saint-Maurice-la-Fougereuse and Étusson.

See also 
Communes of the Deux-Sèvres department

References 

Communes of Deux-Sèvres
States and territories established in 2016
Populated places established in 2016